Civitella Marittima is a village in southern Tuscany, in central Italy, administratively part of the municipality of Civitella Paganico, of which it houses the seat. It is located in the valley of the  Ombrone river, at 329 metres above sea level. In 2001 it had a population of 517 inhabitants.

History 
The town is of Etruscan origins, although the current settlement dates to around 1000 AD. It was a possession and the main centre of the Ardengheschi family, and later was occupied by the Republic of Siena until the mid-16th century, when it became part of the Grand Duchy of Tuscany.

It has medieval walls and a series of Renaissance edifices.

See also 
 Casale di Pari
 Dogana, Civitella Paganico
 Monte Antico
 Paganico
 Pari, Civitella Paganico

External links 
  Civitella Marittima, Civitella Paganico official website.

Frazioni of Civitella Paganico